The Union of England and Scotland Act 1603 (1 Jac 1 c 2), full title An Act authorizing certain Commissioners of the realm of England to treat with Commissioners of Scotland, for the weal of both kingdoms, was an Act of Parliament of the Parliament of England enacted during the reign of King James I. It appointed a commission led by the Lord Chancellor, Lord Ellesmere, to meet and negotiate with a commission which would be appointed by the Parliament of Scotland. The aim of the discussions was to look into the possibility of arranging a formal political union between England and Scotland, going beyond the existing Union of Crowns, and to report back to Parliament. The commission was not effective, however, and similar subsequent proposals also fell flat. The two kingdoms were eventually united over a century later, by the Acts of Union 1707.

The Act was repealed by the Statute Law Revision Act 1863, being by this point entirely obsolete.

References
Select statutes and other constitutional documents illustrative of the reigns of Elizabeth and James I, ed. by G. W. Prothero. Oxford University Press, 1913. Fourth edition.
Chronological table of the statutes; HMSO, London. 1993

1603 in law
1603 in England
Acts of the Parliament of England
England–Scotland relations
Unionism in Scotland
Unionism in the United Kingdom
1603 in Scotland